USS Sublette County (LST-1144) was a  in the United States Navy during World War II. She was transferred to the Republic of China Navy as ROCS Chung Yeh (LST-231).

Construction and commissioning 
LST-1144 was laid down on 3 February 1945 at Chicago Bridge and Iron Company, Seneca, Illinois. Launched on 2 May 1945 and commissioned on 28 May 1945.

Service in United States Navy 

During World War II, LST-1144 was assigned to the Atlantic Fleet. She was assigned to occupation and Europe from 19 January to 5 May 1951, 17 October 1951 to 26 January 1952 and 14 January to 22 June 1953.

She was decommissioned on 11 February 1955 and struck from the Naval Register on 1 June 1960 after she was transferred to the Republic of China and renamed Chung Yeh (LST-231). While being mothballed on 1 July 1955, she was given the name Sublette County.

Service in Republic of China Navy 
She participated in multiple naval exercises throughout the years.

Awards 
LST-1144 have earned the following awards:

American Campaign Medal 
National Defense Service Medal
World War II Victory Medal
Navy Occupation Service Medal (with Europe clasp)

Citations

Sources
 
 
 
 

LST-542-class tank landing ships
Ships built in Seneca, Illinois
World War II amphibious warfare vessels of the United States
LST-542-class tank landing ships of the Republic of China Navy
1945 ships